Julius Sophus Emil Ebert (2 December 1898 – 2 March 1993) was a Danish long-distance runner. He competed in the men's 10,000 metres at the 1920 Summer Olympics.

References

1898 births
1993 deaths
Athletes (track and field) at the 1920 Summer Olympics
Danish male long-distance runners
Olympic athletes of Denmark
Place of birth missing
Olympic cross country runners